Law Kwok-tai (or transliterated as Lo Kwok Tai; 5 August 1929 – 1 September 2013) was a football coach and a Republic of China (Taiwan) international footballer, but born and spent his entire playing and coaching career in the British Hong Kong, a colony that geographically located in the southern China. Law retired as a professional footballer in 1976, aged 47. That season he was a player-manager. He coached until the 1990s, at aged 60s. At international level he played for Republic of China (Taiwan) in the Olympics as well as Asian Games and AFC Asian Cup. He also played for Hong Kong League XI in non-official match in Merdeka Tournament, as well as "Hong Kong Chinese" team in another friendly tournament, Ho Ho Cup.

Club career
At club level, Law played for Eastern of the Hong Kong First Division League.

International career
Law participated in the 1960 Olympics for the Republic of China (Taiwan, now played as Chinese Taipei). He played his only appearance in that tournament, against Brazil.

He also played in 1960 and 1968 AFC Asian Cup, as well as 1958 Asian Games, where he won the goal medal. He scored against his native Hong Kong in 1968 AFC Asian Cup.

He also represented Hong Kong League XI, a scratch team of the Hong Kong Football Association (HKFA) for 1957 Merdeka Tournament, a friendly tournament. The team was mainly composed of players from the football club Eastern, but most of them in fact ineligible to Hong Kong team, who already played for aforementioned Republic of China (Taiwan).

He also represented another team Hong Kong Chinese team in 1959, against Costa Rican club Deportivo Saprissa in a friendly match and against Malayan Chinese team in the Ho Ho Cup.

Coaching career
After retirement as a professional footballer, Law became a football coach. He coached Eastern, (as player-manager in 1975–76 season and in the 1980s), Kwong Wah, Sea Bee, Tsuen Wan, Po Chai Pills, Happy Valley, as well as Martini (1990–91) and Singtao (1991 to ?) in the 1990s. Those clubs were all based in Hong Kong.

Sea Bee
Law was hired as the head coach of Sea Bee in 1977. He coached the team until the end of the 1981–82 Hong Kong First Division League.

He also attended an advanced coaching course that was conducted by a West German coach as well as sponsored by the West German Consulate General Hong Kong in 1980.

Tsuen Wan
Law was the head coach of Tsuen Wan from 1982. He was dismissed in January 1983.

Eastern (second and the third spells)
Law was the head coach of Eastern in the 1980s. He resigned in April 1985. The club also promoted his assistant But Wai-hong as head coach.

Law was re-hired by Eastern in November 1985 as vice-manager and head coach. In the next season, Law and Leung Chun-kuen were hired as joint-head coach of Eastern in June 1986. The latter was promoted from footballer and would attended coaching class in August 1986 in the United Kingdom. In June 1987, Law was reassigned from the head coach to the technical consultant of Eastern. Soon later he left the club.

Po Chai Pills
Law was hired as head coach by Po Chai Pills, a newcomer of 1987–88 Hong Kong First Division League in 1987. The club is a namesake of the Po Chai Pills, a proprietary Chinese medicine. The club relegated back to the second division in 1988.

Happy Valley

He won Hong Kong First Division League with Happy Valley in 1989. However, his contract was not renewed.

Martini
Law was hired by Martini, a club from the second division as head coach in the 1990–91 season. He resigned in January 1991 but changed his mind in the same month. He resigned again in March 1991.

Singtao
Law was hired by Singtao in June 1991, replacing .

Honours
As player
 Asian Games
 1958 (Republic of China or Taiwan)
As coach
 Hong Kong First Division League
 1988–89 (Happy Valley)

Personal life
Law was known for pro-Republic of China (Taiwan) as his political affiliation. In 1962, an advertisement on New Evening Post, claimed Law and some of the footballers, congratulated the 12th anniversary of the establishment of New Evening Post, a pro-People's Republic of China (Communist Party of China) newspaper.

Law died on 1 September 2013 in the Eastern Hospital, Hong Kong, according to Eastern Football Team; or before 2014, according to former teammate Law Pak during an interview.

References

External links
 
 

Taiwanese footballers
Hong Kong footballers
Hong Kong football managers
Eastern Sports Club footballers
Eastern Sports Club football managers
Sea Bee managers
Kwong Wah AA managers
Happy Valley AA managers
Sing Tao SC managers
Hong Kong First Division League players
Chinese Taipei international footballers
Chinese Taipei international footballers from Hong Kong
Footballers at the 1958 Asian Games
Medalists at the 1958 Asian Games
1960 AFC Asian Cup players
1968 AFC Asian Cup players
Asian Games medalists in football
Asian Games gold medalists for Chinese Taipei
Footballers at the 1960 Summer Olympics
Olympic footballers of Taiwan
Association football forwards
1929 births
2013 deaths